Colombian singer Shakira has performed on six concert tours of which four are worldwide, six one-off concerts, four benefit concerts and nine music festivals.

Pies Descalzos Tour, Anfibio Tour and Tour of the Mongoose 
Her 1997 debut concert tour, Pies Descalzos Tour, took place in North America, South America, and one country in Europe alone, grossing over US$5 million (based on as-record figures). In 2000 she performed on her Anfibio Tour, which visited only North and South America, earning more than 10 million dollars (based on the figures of which there are second records), being a success and being a total sold in countries like Brazil, something never seen before for a Latin artist. It was until the global success of her album "Laundry Service" which would lead to one of the most successful tours in Shakira's career with the "Tour of the Mongoose" being until then the highest grossing of her career being a success in assistance in countries such as France, USA, UK, Brazil and more countries. A figure almost never before reached by a Latin artist, much less from South America. Thanks to this tour, Shakira became the first Latin female artist to perform at the Estadio Monumental Antonio Vespucio Liberti in Argentina (River Plate's stadium), the sold-out show was attended by more than 60,000 people. The concert in Santiago, Chile, broke Luis Miguel's record for the most expensive concert tickets in the country due to Shakira's enormous worldwide popularity and high demand. The show at the Pabellón Atlántico, Lisbon, has attracted 19,136 people, breaking the attendance record held by the American rock trio R.E.M.

Oral Fixation World Tour 
Years after the success of her first international tour Shakira would embark on her second world tour thanks to the success of her albums Fijación Oral Vol. 1 and Oral Fixation Vol. 2, Shakira once again embarked on a tour called "Oral Fixation World Tour" on which is her first tour where he visits countries on the Asian continent such as India and the United Arab Emirates because she was unable to do so with her previous tour due to the Covid outbreak of those years. She has broken many records during this tour. In Athens, she is the first female singer to have a show at the Olympic Stadium, attracting more than 40,000 people. In Timiosara, she is the only female singer who performed at the Stadionul Dan Păltinișanu (with more than 30,000 spectators) until 2017. At the American Airlines Arena in Miami, she holds the record for having the most shows (5 shows) in the place as a woman. artist with only one tour. In Cairo, more than 100,000 people accompanied Shakira at her concert on the Giza Plateau. This sets the record for having the highest attendance in Egypt's concert history. At the Palacio de los Deportes in Mexico City, she had 8 shows in the venue consecutively, holding the record for having the most shows in the venue as a female artist. She had a sold-out show at the Estadio Modelo Alberto Spencer Herrera in Guayaquil with over 42,000 people, becoming the only female singer playing there. In Santiago, her first show at Movistar Arena quickly sold out and she later added a second show at the Estadio Nacional which also sold out completely. This tour became the artist's highest-grossing tour and the highest grossing Latin tour of all time.

The Sun Comes Out World Tour and El Dorado World Tour 
To promote the albums She Wolf and Sale el Sol Shakira began her tour The Sun Comes Out, being a success and breaking more attendance records for a Latin artist in general than ever before witnessed. She visited a total of 107 countries raising nearly 80 million dollars and breaking records in Mérida (Mexico) where she broke the attendance record where 170,000 people attended. The concert in Lebanon was attended by 28,000 people, breaking the country's all-time attendance record. It was one of the highest-grossing tours of 2010. According to Pollstar, the tour grossed a total of $16.9 million during its North American dates, making it number 40 on Pollstar's "Top 50 North American Tours" year-end 2010 list.

Years later without any tour presented in almost 6 years Shakira embarked on a new tour to promote her most recent record material "El Dorado" raising 70 million dollars breaking records again in countries like Mexico where she was the first female artist to fill the Stadium Azteca twice in a row and in Ecuador, broke the record previously held by Bruno Mars for having sold the most tickets during a presale period.

Concert tours

Songs played on each tour

One-off concerts

Benefit concerts

Music festivals

Shakira live album charts

Live albums

References 

Concerts
Shakira